George W. Bush, a Republican from Texas, was elected President of the United States on December 12, 2000 (following the U.S. Supreme Court decision in Bush v. Gore) and was inaugurated as the nation's 43rd president on January 20, 2001. Re-elected on November 2, 2004, his second inauguration was on January 20, 2005, and his presidency ended on January 20, 2009 with the inauguration of Barack Obama. The following articles cover the timeline of Bush's presidency:

 Pre-presidency: 1999–2001
George W. Bush 2000 presidential campaign
Presidential transition of George W. Bush
 Presidency: 2001–2009
Timeline of the George W. Bush presidency (2001)
Timeline of the George W. Bush presidency (2002)
Timeline of the George W. Bush presidency (2003)
Timeline of the George W. Bush presidency (2004)
Timeline of the George W. Bush presidency (2005)
Timeline of the George W. Bush presidency (2006)
Timeline of the George W. Bush presidency (2007)
Timeline of the George W. Bush presidency (2008–January 2009)

See also
 Timeline of the Bill Clinton presidency, for his predecessor
 Timeline of the Barack Obama presidency, for his successor

Bush, George W.
Presidency of George W. Bush